Leucopogon attenuatus, commonly known as grey beard-heath, is a species of flowering plant in the family Ericaceae. It has grey-green leaves and small white flowers and grows in New South Wales and the Australian Capital Territory.

Description

Taxonomy and naming
Leucopogon attenuatus was first formally described in 1825 and the description was published in Geographical Memoirs on New South Wales. The specific epithet (attenuatus) means "narrowing to a point".

Distribution and habitat
Grey beard-heath grows in dry, rocky slopes in woodlands and heath on sandy soils in New South Wales and the Australian Capital Territory. In Victoria the species is known as Styphelia attenuatus.

References

attenuatus
Ericales of Australia
Flora of New South Wales
Plants described in 1814